The Roman Catholic Diocese of Autun (–Chalon-sur-Saône–Mâcon–Cluny) (Latin: Dioecesis Augustodunensis (–Cabillonensis–Matisconensis–Cluniacensis); French: Diocèse d'Autun (–Chalon-sur-Saône–Mâcon–Cluny)), more simply known as the Diocese of Autun, is a diocese of the Latin Church of the Roman Catholic Church in France. The diocese comprises the entire Department of Saone et Loire, in the Region of Bourgogne.

The diocese was suffragan to the Archdiocese of Lyon under the Ancien Régime, and the Bishop of Autun held the post of Vicar of the Archbishop. The bishopric of Chalon-sur-Saône (since Roman times) and (early medieval) bishopric of Mâcon, also suffragans of Lyon, were united to Autun after the French Revolution by the Concordat signed by First Consul Napoleon Bonaparte and Pope Pius VII. For a short time, from 1802 to 1822, the enlarged diocese of Autun was suffragan to the Archbishop of Besançon. In 1822, however, Autun was again subject to the Archbishop of Lyon. The diocese of Autun is now, since 8 December 2002, suffragan to the Archbishop of Dijon. The current bishop of Autun is Benoit Rivière.

History

Christian teaching reached Autun at a very early period, as is known from the famous funeral inscription, in classical Greek, of a certain Pectorius which dates from the 3rd century. It was found in 1839 in the cemetery of St. Peter l'Estrier at Autun, and makes reference to baptism and the Holy Eucharist.

Local recensions of the "Passion" of St. Symphorianus of Autun tell the story that, on the eve of the persecution of Septimius Severus, St. Polycarp assigned to Irenaeus two priests and a deacon (Benignus, Andochius and Thyrsus), all three of whom departed for Autun. St. Benignus went on to Langres, while the others remained at Autun. According to this legendary cycle, which dates from about the first half of the 6th century, it was not then believed at Autun that the city was an episcopal see in the time of St. Irenaeus (c. 140–211). Another tradition current at Autun, however, names St. Amator as its first bishop and places his episcopacy about 250. The first bishop known to history, however, is Saint Reticius, an ecclesiastical writer and contemporary of the Emperor Constantine I (306–337).

Early Bishops
Euphronius, who became Bishop of Autun, is credited with the foundation of the first monastic house at Autun in 421, the Priory of S. Symphorien. In 1792 and 1793 the buildings were sold for the stone material and demolished. In 1993 the remains were classified as an historical monument by the French Government. In 452, Bishop Euphronius observed a comet, and sent a description of the event to Count Agrippinus, Magister Militum. Bishop Euphronius and Bishop Patiens were highly praised by Sidonius Apollinaris, son-in-law of the Emperor Avitus and Bishop of Clermont Ferrand, for conducting the election of a bishop of Chalons in a particularly upright fashion, without simony, aristocratic favoritism, or submission to the popular will. In 472 Bishop Sidonius invited Bishop Euphronius to Bourges for the election of Sidonius' Metropolitan.

Beginning in 599, the Bishop of Autun enjoyed until the late 20th century the right of wearing the pallium of a metropolitan bishop, in virtue of a privilege granted to Bishop Syagrius and his See by Pope Gregory I (590–604). Autun was to be a metropolis throughout its own locality, with second place in Gaul after Lugdunum. Gregory was very eager to have a church council in France to stamp out the vice of simony, and he appealed to Queen Brunhilda to use her influence to organize it; he especially recommended Bishop Syagrius of Autun to the Queen as his most reliable agent.

During the Merovingian era Autun was a politically important diocese. Two Bishops figured prominently in political affairs: Syagrius of Autun, bishop during the second half of the 6th century, a contemporary of Germanus, bishop of Paris, who was a native of Autun; and Leodegar (St. Léger), bishop from 663 to 680, who came into conflict with Ebroin, Mayor of the Palace of Neustria, and was put to death by order of Theoderic III.

The Abbey of St. Martin was founded in 602 by Queen Brunhilda of Austrasia, and it was there that her remains were interred – the deposed monarch having been repeatedly racked for three days, torn apart by four horses, and then burnt on a pyre. By the mid-tenth century, however, the abbey was no longer in operation. In 949 the Burgundian Counts Giselbert and Hugh imported monks from Cluny to reform the moribund monastery, and to elect their own abbot. When the abbey was destroyed in 1793, Brunhilda's sarcophagus was removed, and it is now in the Musée Lapidaire in Avignon.

Councils of Autun
The first council was held in 663, 670, or 677, under Bishop Leodegarius, for the purpose of regulating the discipline of the Benedictine monasteries. Monks were forbidden to have 'special friends' (compatres), or to have woman friends, or to be about in towns. The council ordered all ecclesiastics to learn by heart the Apostles Creed and the Athanasian Creed. This seems to be the earliest mention of the Athanasian Creed in France. The 19th century Benedictine Cardinal Pitra says in his "Histoire de St. Léger" that this canon may have been directed against Monothelitism, then seeking entrance into the Gallican churches, but already condemned in the Athenasian Creed. The Rule of St. Benedict was also prescribed as the normal monastic code.

In a Council of 1065, Saint Hugh, Abbot of Cluny, along with four bishops, accomplished the reconciliation of Robert I, Duke of Burgundy, with Hagano the Bishop of Autun.

In 1077 Hugues, Bishop of Die held a council at Autun, by order of Pope Gregory VII. The council deposed Manasses, Archbishop of Reims, for simony and usurpation of the see, and reproved other bishops for absence from the council. In 1094 Hugues, by then Archbishop of Lyon, and thirty-three other bishops meeting at Autun renewed the excommunication of Holy Roman Emperor Henry IV, the Antipope Guibert and their partisans, and also that of King Philip of France, guilty of bigamy. Simony, ecclesiastical disorders, and monastic usurpations provoked other decrees, only one of which is extant, forbidding the monks to induce the canons to enter monasteries.

There was also a Council in Autun in October 1094.

In the 1150s a quarrel over jurisdiction and independence broke out between Bishop Henri de Bourgogne of Autun and Abbot Reginald of Flavigny. The quarrel became so serious that it reached the royal court, and continued there for some time. Finally, in 1160, King Louis VII ruled that his predecessors had infeudated the Bishops of Autun with the lands of Flavigny, and that the Abbot of Flavigny was subinfeudated to the Bishops of Autun. The ruling scarcely settled the quarrel, however, which dragged on throughout the rest of the century, requiring repeated royal intervention; conflicts appear repeatedly in the thirteenth century as well.

Following the beginning of the Great Schism in 1378, the bishops of Autun were appointed, as they had been throughout the fourteenth century, by the Avignon pope, now Clement VII. After the Concordat of 1516 between Francis I and Leo X, however, the King of France held the right to appoint bishops in France, with the consent of the pope. This arrangement persisted until the French Revolution.

Gabriel de Roquette was bishop from 1666 till 1702, through most of the reign of Louis XIV. According to the Duc de Saint-Simon, he was the model for the character "Tartuffe" in Molière's play Tartuffe.

The devotion to the Sacred Heart originated in the Visitation Convent at Paray-le-Monial, founded in 1644, and now the object of frequent pilgrimages. Its promoter was Sister Margaret Mary Alacoque, a cloistered nun who claimed to have visions between 1673 and 1675, in which Jesus personally taught her the devotion.

Revolution and aftermath
Much later, Charles Maurice de Talleyrand-Périgord, the future diplomat, Foreign Minister, and Prince of Benevento, was Bishop of Autun from 1788 to 1791. He participated in the Fête de la Fédération in Paris on 14 July 1790, and celebrated a pontifical Mass as bishop. On 27 December 1790 he took the oath to the Civil Constitution of the Clergy, and notified his clergy in Autun of the fact on 29 December, with the recommendation that they do the same. He was elected Constitutional Bishop of Saône-et-Loire, but, eager to avoid further trouble, he himself resigned the Constitutional bishopric in January 1791. But as to the Diocese of Autun of the Ancien Régime, that resignation required papal permission, and Pope Pius VI obliged by dismissing Talleyrand as a schismatic in a bull of 13 April 1791. He continued to be a bishop, however, until Napoleon forced Pius VII to concede that the Bishop of Autun "might wear secular attire and serve the French Republic in an official capacity," something that Talleyrand had been doing anyway since 1790. The Pope, however, found no precedent in church history for a bishop being returned to the lay state, and refused to do so in 1801; Talleyrand was still a bishop when he died in 1838. As a bishop Talleyrand carried out the consecration of two Constitutional bishops on 24 February 1791, the bishops Louis Alexandre Expilly of the Aisne, and Claude Eustache François Marolles of Finistère. The ceremony took place in Paris at the Church of the Oratory, and Talleyrand was assisted by the titular bishops Miroudot du Bourg of Babylon and Gobel of Lyda. The consecrations were illicit but valid, and on 13 April 1791 a papal bull deprived Talleyrand of his faculties and threatened excommunication.

As soon as Talleyrand resigned, the voters of the new Constitutional diocese of Saône-et-Loire elected a new bishop, Jean-Louis Gouttes. He had been a priest of the Roman Catholic Church for twenty-three years. He had been a vicar in a parish near Bordeaux, then at Gros-Caillou, and obtained a chapel at Montaubon. He obtained his own parish at Argellieres in the diocese of Narbonne in 1785, though he was chosen as one of the deputies to the National Assembly from the diocese of Béziers in March 1789. He served on the finance committee, and was elected President of the National Assembly on 29 April 1790. On 14 June he oversaw the passage of Article 29 of the Constitution, which removed the power of instituting bishops from the hands of the Pope. On 15 February 1791 Abbé Gouttes was elected by an absolute majority of the representatives of the voters of Saône-et-Loire, meeting in Mâcon for the purpose of electing a new bishop in accordance with the Constitution of 1790. On 3 April 1791 he was consecrated at Notre Dame in Paris along with four other Constitutional bishops by Constitutional Bishops Lamourette (Rhône-et-Loire), Périer (Puy-de-Dôme), and Prudhomme (Sarthe). On 7 January 1794, however, Gouttes was arrested as a counter-revolutionary and crypto-royalist, and sent to Paris. He spent several months in prison, was tried on orders of the Committee of Public Safety, and sent to the guillotine on 26 March 1794.

The diocese of Autun was without a bishop of any complexion until Napoleon came to power and decided that, for the sake of French unity and his own plans, peace had to be arranged with the Papacy. In 1801, under the new Concordat, Pius VII reorganized the episcopal structure of France and suppressed the bishopric of Mâcon. Bishop Gabriel-François Moreau, who had been Bishop of Macon but who had emigrated during the Revolution, was appointed Bishop of Autun on 20 July 1802. He died on 8 September 1802 at the age of eighty. The office of Archdeacon of Mâcon continued to exist, but its holder now belonged to the diocese of Autun, and was made a Canon of the Cathedral of Saint-Lazare. The Archdeaconries of Autun and of Châlons were combined into one office.

In 1874 Adolphe-Louis-Albert Perraud was named Bishop of Autun, having previously been Professor of Ecclesiastical History at the Sorbonne. He was elected a member of the French Academy in 1882, and named a Cardinal by Pope Leo XIII in 1893 though the fact was not made public until 1895. He died in 1906.

In the Diocese of Autun are still to be seen the remains of the Benedictine Abbey of Tournus and the Abbey of Cluny, to which 2,000 monasteries were subject. Gelasius II (1118–19) died at Cluny, and therefore Cluny was the site of the Conclave that elected Pope Calixtus II (1119–24). On 15 December 1962, the territorial Abbey of Cluny was attached to the Diocese of Autun, and the Bishop of Autun now enjoys the title of Abbot of Cluny.

Bishops

To 1000

c. 270: Saint Amator I (Amatre I)
c. 273: Saint Martin I
c. 273: Saint Reverianus
c. 310–334: Saint Reticius (Rhétice)
355: Saint Cassian of Autun (Cassien)
c. 374: Saint Egemoine
c. 420: Saint Simplicius (Simplice)
Saint Evantius (Evance)
Saint Léonce
c. 450–490:Saint Euphronius
c. 495: Flavichon
c. 517: Pragmatius
Saint Proculus I
Valeolus
Proculus II
c. 533–538: Agrippin
540–549: Saint Nectarius
Eupard
† 560: Rémi or Bénigne
c. 560–600: Syagrius
Lefaste
Flavien
625–630: Auspice
Racho of Autun
c. 657: Ferréol
659–678: Saint Leodegar
c. 678–c. 690: Hermenarius
692: Ansbert
c. 732: Vascon
Amatre II
c. 744: Morannus
c. 755: Gairon
765: Hiddon
Rainaud or Renaud I
Martin II
Alderic
815–c. 840: Modoin
840–842:Bernon or Bernhard
c. 843: Altée
850–866: Jonas
874: Lindon
893: Adalgaire
c. 895–919: Wallon de Vergy
c. 920–929: Hervée de Vergy
935–968: Rotmond
c. 970–976: Gérard

1000–1300

ca. 977–1024: Gautier I
1025–1055: Elmuin
ca. 1055–1098: Hagano (Aganon)
1098–1112: Norgaud
1112–1140: Etienne de Baugé (Stephen of Autun)
1140: Robert de Bourgogne
1140–1148: Humbert de Baugé
1148–1170 or 1171: Henri de Bourgogne
1171–1189: Etienne II
1189–1223: Gautier II
1224–1245: Guy I. de Vergy
1245–1253: Anselin de Pomard
1253–1276 or 1282: Girard de La Roche or de Beauvoir
1283–1286: Jacques I. de Beauvoir
1287–1298: Hugues d'Arcy

1300–1500

1298–1308: Barthélémy
1309–1322: Elie Guidonis
1322–1331: Pierre Bertrand
1331–1343: Jean I d'Arcy
1343–1345: Guillaume I d'Auxonne
1345–1351: Guy II de La Chaume
1351–1358: Guillaume II de Thurey
1358–1361: Renaud II de Maubernard
1361–1377: Geoffroi David or Pauteix
1377–1379: Pierre II de Barrière Mirepoix
1379–1385: Guillaume III de Vienne, O.S.B.
1387–1400: Nicolas I de Coulon
1401–1414: Milon de Grancey
1419–1436: Frédéric de Grancey
1436–1483: Cardinal Jean Rolin

1500–1800

1490–1500: Antoine I. de Chalon
1500–1501: Jean III. Rolin
1501–1503: Louis d'Amboise
9 August 1503 – 5 March 1505: Philippe de Clèves
1505–1546: Jacques II. Hurault de Cheverny
1548–1550: Ippolito II d'Este
1550–1557: Philibert Dugny de Courgengoux, O.S.B.
1558–1572: Pierre III. de Marcilly
1585: Charles d'Ailleboust
1588–1612: Pierre IV. Saunier
1621–1652: Claude de la Magdelaine
1653–1664: Louis II. Doni d'Attichy
1666–1702: Gabriel de Roquette
1702–1709: Bernard de Senaux
1710–1721: Charles Andrault de Maulévrier-Langeron
1721–1724: Charles-François d'Hallencourt de Dromesnil
1724–1732: Antoine-François de Bliterswick
1732–1748: Gaspard de Thomas de La Valette
1748–1758: Antoine de Malvin de Montazet (later archbishop of Lyon)
1758–1767: Nicolas II. de Bouillé
1767–1788: Yves-Alexandre de Marbeuf (later archbishop of Lyon)
1788–1791: Charles-Maurice de Talleyrand-Périgord
April 1791 – 1793: Jean-Louis Gouttes (Constitutional Bishop)

From 1800

9 April 1802–8. September 1802: Gabriel-François Moreau
1802–1806: François de Fontanges (with the title Archbishop)
1806–1819: Fabien-Sébastien Imberties
1819–1829: Roch-Etienne de Vichy
1829–1851: Bénigne-Urbain-Jean-Marie du Trousset d'Héricourt
1851–1872: Frédéric-Gabriel-Marie-François de Marguerye
1872–1873: Léopold-René Leséleuc de Kerouara
1874–1906: Adolphe-Louis-Albert Perraud (Cardinal, Superior General of the Oratory)
1906–1914: Henri-Raymond Villard
1915–1922: Désiré-Hyacinthe Berthoin
1922–1940: Hyacinthe-Jean Chassagnon
1940–1966: Lucien-Sidroine Lebrun (d. 1985)
1966–1987: Armand-François Le Bourgeois, C.I.M.
1987–2006: Raymond Gaston Joseph Séguy
2006–present Benoît Marie Pascal Rivière

See also
Catholic Church in France

References

Bibliography

Reference books

 pp. 72–73. (in Latin)
 pp. 80–81.
 pp. 95–96.
 p. 70.
 p. 70.
 p. 67.

Madignier, Jacques (ed.) (2010): Fasti Ecclesiae Gallicanae. Répertoire prosopographique des évêques, dignitaires et chanoines des diocèses de France de 1200 à 1500. XII. Diocèse d'Autun. Turnhout, Brepols.

Studies

External links
  Centre national des Archives de l'Église de France, L'Épiscopat francais depuis 1919, retrieved: 2016-12-24.

 
Autun